Brachymasicera is a genus of bristle flies in the family Tachinidae. There are at least three described species in Brachymasicera.

Species
These three species belong to the genus Brachymasicera:
 Brachymasicera nigripes Townsend, 1928 c g
 Brachymasicera polita Townsend, 1911 c g
 Brachymasicera subpolita Townsend, 1912 c g
Data sources: i = ITIS, c = Catalogue of Life, g = GBIF, b = Bugguide.net

References

Further reading

External links

 
 

Tachinidae